Highway 229 is a highway in the Canadian province of Saskatchewan. It runs from Highway 47 to Highway 9.

Highway 229 passes near the Good Spirit Lake Provincial Park. Good Spirit Acres, Kitchimanitou Beach, Donald Gunn Subdivision, and Good Spirit Lake are accessible from the highway.

See also 
Roads in Saskatchewan
Transportation in Saskatchewan

References 

229